Chernihiv bombing may refer to:
 3 March 2022 Chernihiv bombing
 16 March 2022 Chernihiv breadline attack